Araeophylla languidella is a species of moth in the family Gelechiidae. It was described by Hans Georg Amsel in 1936. It is found in Palestine.

References

Araeophylla
Moths described in 1936
Moths of the Middle East